Plot

Orphaned as an infant, Ranga (played by Rajkumar) is brought up by his distant relative Chandrashekhar Rao Bahadur (Sampath) and his compassionate wife Parvathi (M Jayashree).

Chandrashekhar Rao heads a large family of three sons Ramnatha (Vajramuni),  Somanatha (Bengaluru Nagesh) and Vishwantha (Dwarakish), two daughters, the widowed Rajamma (Lakshmi Devi), their young children and Rajamma’ son. Parvathi promises her childhood friend Mayakka that she will take her daughter Lakshmi (Jayanthi) as her third daughter-in-law but ends up giving her in marriage to Ranga when her third son (he is in love with Lepakshi (B Jaya) refuses to marry her.

Life takes a cruel turn for Chandrashekhar Rao when he loses all his wealth in share market. His daughter’s marriage is called off, his sons attitude change and he is forced to send Ranga and Lakshmi out. He dies heartbroken. Ranga with the help of Kotaiah (Balakrishna) finds a job in a factory owned by Rachappa (Mahadevappa) whose son is to have married Geetha. How Ranga sets right the turmoil in the family and reunites them forms rest of the story.

Baala Bandhana is a 1971 Indian Kannada language romantic drama film, directed by Peketi Sivaram. It stars Rajkumar and Jayanthi. It was produced under ALS Productions. It had a very successful soundtrack composed by G. K. Venkatesh. The film was a remake of 1953 Bengali film Jog Biyog  which was based on the novel of same name by Ashapurna Devi. Though a hit, it could not meet the success of the Tamil and Telugu remake versions of the same Bengali movie.

Cast

Soundtrack 
The music of the film was composed by G. K. Venkatesh and lyrics for the soundtrack written by Ku.Ra.Sitaramashashtry and Vijaya Narasimha. All the songs were received very well. The duet "Chinnadanta Naadige" became hugely popular upon release.

Track list

See also
 Kannada films of 1971
 Padikkadha Medhai

References

External links 
 

1971 films
1970s Kannada-language films
Indian black-and-white films
Indian drama films
Kannada remakes of Bengali films
Films scored by G. K. Venkatesh
Films directed by Peketi Sivaram
1971 drama films
Films based on works by Ashapurna Devi